Lowell Wagner (August 21, 1923September 26, 2005) was a professional American football cornerback in the All-America Football Conference (AAFC) and the National Football League (NFL). He played eleven seasons for the AAFC's New York Yankees (1946–1948) and AAFC and NFL's San Francisco 49ers (1949–1955). 

One of Wagner's greatest games was the final game of the 1951 season, when the 49ers beat the Detroit Lions 21-17 at Kezar Stadium. Wagner intercepted three passes, two leading to 49er touchdown drives, and the third stopping a Lions drive in the fourth quarter. The loss knocked the Lions out of the National Conference race and allowed the Los Angeles Rams to win the Conference title. 

1923 births
2005 deaths
Sportspeople from Los Angeles County, California
American football cornerbacks
New York Yankees (AAFC) players
People from Gardena, California
San Francisco 49ers (AAFC) players
San Francisco 49ers players
USC Trojans football players
Players of American football from California